Stenaelurillus senegalensis is a jumping spider species in the genus Stenaelurillus that lives in Senegal. It was first described in 2018.

References

Salticidae
Spiders described in 2018
Spiders of Africa